Deharkalakuchi is a census village in Nalbari district, Assam, India. As per the 2011 Census of India, Deharkalakuchi has a total population of 2,802 people including 1,435 males and 1,367 females with a literacy rate of 64.85%.

References 

Cities and towns in Nalbari district